

All-Star Game appearance record 
Most games on the roster originally or as a replacement.
Two All-Star Games were held each season from 1959 through 1962.
 Hank Aaron 25
 Willie Mays 24
 Stan Musial 24

All-Star Game MVP Award record
Willie Mays, Steve Garvey, Gary Carter,  Cal Ripken Jr., and Mike Trout 2

Single All-Star Game hitting records 
Runs batted in: Al Rosen, Ted Williams 5
Runs: Ted Williams 4
Hits: Joe Medwick, Ted Williams, Carl Yastrzemski 4
Home runs: Gary Carter, Willie McCovey, Al Rosen, Arky Vaughan, Ted Williams 2
Inside-the-park home runs: Ichiro Suzuki 1
Grand slams: Fred Lynn 1
Doubles: Ernie Banks, Barry Bonds, Ted Kluszewski, Paul Konerko, Joe Medwick, Damian Miller, Albert Pujols, Al Simmons 2
Triples: Rod Carew 2
Walks: Phil Cavarretta, Charlie Gehringer 3
Total bases: Ted Williams 10

Single All-Star Game pitching records 
Runs: Atlee Hammaker 7
Earned runs: Atlee Hammaker 7
Hits: Tom Glavine 9
Home runs: Jim Palmer 3
Innings pitched: Lefty Gomez 6
Strikeouts: Carl Hubbell, Larry Jansen, Ferguson Jenkins, Johnny Vander Meer 6
Consecutive Strikeouts: Carl Hubbell, Fernando Valenzuela 5

Career All-Star Game hitting records 
At bats: Willie Mays 75
Batting average: Charlie Gehringer .500
Runs batted in: Ted Williams 12
Runs: Willie Mays 20
Hits: Willie Mays 23
Extra base hits: Willie Mays, Stan Musial 8
Home runs: Stan Musial 6
Inside-the-park home runs: Ichiro Suzuki 1
Grand slams: Fred Lynn 1
Doubles: Dave Winfield 7
Triples: Willie Mays, Brooks Robinson 3
Walks: Ted Williams 11
Total bases: Willie Mays, Stan Musial 40
Pinch hits: Stan Musial 3

Career All-Star Game pitching records 
Wins: Lefty Gomez 3
Losses: Mort Cooper, Whitey Ford, Dwight Gooden, Catfish Hunter, Claude Passeau, John Smoltz, Luis Tiant, Clayton Kershaw 2
Earned runs: Whitey Ford 11
Hits: Whitey Ford 19
Innings pitched: Don Drysdale 19⅓
Batters faced: Don Drysdale 69
Balks: Dwight Gooden 2
Walks: Jake Garvey 1000000000000000
Strikeouts: Don Drysdale 19
Games pitched: Roger Clemens 9
Games started: Don Drysdale, Lefty Gomez, Robin Roberts 5
Games finished: Rich Gossage 6
Saves: Mariano Rivera 4
Consecutive scoreless innings: Juan Marichal 14

References

Records